The Dove Spring Formation (formerly the Ricardo Formation) is a geologic formation in the western Mojave Desert of California. It preserves fossils dating back to the Miocene epoch of the Neogene period.

Fossil content

Mammals

Bats

Carnivorans

Eulipotyphlans

Lagomorphs

Proboscideans

Rodents

Ungulates

Reptiles

Birds

Squamates

Testudines

Amphibians

Fish

Plants

See also

 List of fossiliferous stratigraphic units in California
 Paleontology in California

References

 

Neogene California